The Mstislav Rostropovich (former Mikhail Kalinin) is a Valerian Kuybyshev-class (92-016, OL400) Soviet/Russian river cruise ship, cruising in the Volga basin. The ship was built by Slovenské Lodenice at their shipyard in Komárno, Czechoslovakia, and entered service in 1981. At 3,953 tonnes, Mstislav Rostropovich is one of the world's biggest river cruise ships. Her sister ships are Valerian Kuybyshev, Mikhail Frunze, Feliks Dzerzhinskiy, Fyodor Shalyapin, Sergey Kuchkin, Aleksandr Suvorov, Semyon Budyonnyy and Georgiy Zhukov. Mstislav Rostropovich is currently owned by Vodohod and operated by Vodohod for foreign tourists. Her home port is currently Nizhny Novgorod.

Features
Mstislav Rostropovich is the first Vodohod four-star cruise vessel. After reconstruction in 2008–2011 all rooms are equipped with automatic climate control system. The ship has two restaurants, three bars, solarium, sauna and resting area.

See also
 List of river cruise ships

References

External links

Project 92-016 

1981 ships
River cruise ships
Ships built in Czechoslovakia